Mary Jane "MJ" Watson is a fictional character in Sam Raimi's Spider-Man film series. Based on the character of the same name, she is portrayed by Kirsten Dunst. In the films, Mary Jane is Peter Parker's next-door neighbor, childhood crush, and primary love interest. Though Mary Jane dates several other men in the first two films, she ultimately falls in love with Peter and Spider-Man and discovers they are one and the same. Despite his strong feelings for her, Peter initially declines a relationship with her in order to keep her safe, but they eventually become a couple in the end.

Despite being portrayed as a damsel in distress throughout the film series, Dunst's interpretation of the character has been generally well-received.

Character design and portrayal

Comic book origins
Mary Jane Watson was first introduced into Spider-Man comics story-lines in The Amazing Spider-Man #42 in 1966, despite being mentioned earlier in the comics. She was conceived as competition to Gwen Stacy as Spider-Man's primary love interest, and is characterized as a free-spirited, outgoing personality as opposed to Gwen's more serious, academic nature. Peter Parker initially dates Gwen after he stops going out with Mary Jane due to what he sees as her shallow personality while Mary Jane refuses to be tied down in one relationship. Despite this, Mary Jane became more popular with fans and following Gwen's death in the comics, Peter and MJ begin to rekindle their relationship and eventually marry despite ups and downs in the comics.

Casting and execution
Actress Kirsten Dunst was cast as Mary Jane Watson for the 2002 Spider-Man film, with Mary Jane having been cemented in comics lore as Peter Parker's primary love interest by then. Before director Sam Raimi cast Dunst, he had expressed his interest in casting Alicia Witt. Dunst decided to audition after learning Tobey Maguire had been cast as Peter Parker/Spider-Man, feeling the film would have a more independent feel. Dunst earned the role a month before shooting in an audition in Berlin. In the first two films in the trilogy, Dunst wore a red wig for the part, dying part of her hair in the first film, before dying her full head of blond hair red for the third film. Dunst was also allegedly asked to change her teeth for the films, a demand that she refused. She also declined to do certain stunts in the films.

The set-up for Spider-Man and Mary Jane's famous "upside-down kiss" involved several rain-machines at the studio lot, and saw some difficulty as Maguire was hung upside down with water pouring into his nostrils. To achieve the look of Mary Jane pulling Spider-Man's mask down, Dunst was described by Sam Raimi as "doing some hand trickery" as the mask was not pliable in those conditions.

Having initially signed on for three Spider-Man films, Dunst said that she would consider doing a fourth, but only if Raimi and Maguire also returned. In January 2010, it was announced that the fourth film was cancelled and that the Spider-Man film series would be restarted, and therefore dropping the trio from the franchise. Storyboard artist Jeffrey Henderson, who worked on the fourth Spider-Man film before the project's cancellation, disclosed in November 2022 that the fourth film would have established that Mary Jane had been "let go" by Peter Parker, leading him to now deeply enjoy being Spider-Man.

In 2021, while attending a screening of her latest film The Power of the Dog, Dunst expressed openness to reprising her role as Mary Jane: "I would do it. Why not? That would be fun. I would never say no to something like that."

Characterization and themes
As portrayed in the Sam Raimi trilogy, Mary Jane Watson is a kind, funny, beautiful, sweet, cheerful, passionate, and energetic young woman who is an aspiring actress. She runs with the stereotypical popular crowd in school, being surrounded by people who have enticing physical features and great skills in ways of performing arts or sports. Mary Jane is somewhat naive, but always knows what's going on. While individuals in MJ's high school clique are rude, snobbish, arrogant, vain and uncaring, Mary Jane is a loyal friend and a warm individual, capable of intense love and real feelings. Mary Jane does not let the attention she gets from boys get to her head. Instead, she uses her looks merely as an advantage for acting and modelling and works to develop independence and smarts. Despite her popularity, MJ struggles with insecurity and an urge to impress people she deems important, both of which most likely come from her abusive father, and is an indecisive dater before Peter finally commits to her. She also deals with the harsh reality of being an actress and has her own struggles in each film.

She never bullies or judges Peter Parker and is friendly towards him, despite him being in the unpopular crowd, and even flirts with him and calls him "Tiger" (an homage to her catchphrase in the comics). MJ generally has no one treat her with respect for anything other than her looks, which she may not have noticed until after high school graduation, before she and Peter develop a stronger friendship. It is quite possibly because of this, Mary Jane becomes so smitten by Spider-Man so quickly and later falls for Peter (oblivious that they are one and the same) as he is very kind to her other than just for her looks. After her kiss with Spider-Man, MJ was shown to be a great deal happier and almost ecstatic, because it had perhaps been her first kiss with someone who loved her back for more than just aesthetic reasons. Unfortunately, her involvement with Spider-Man also makes her a common target by his enemies, making her require his rescue in all three films, as noted by Emily Kubincanek of Film School Rejects.

Writing in 2020 after the release of Spider-Man: Into the Spider-Verse, Adadora Asidianya of CBR.com looked back at Mary Jane's live-action portrayal in the Raimi films and noted that she provides a grounding presence for Peter in the films, also commending her positive outlook in life despite her toxic upbringings.

Appearances

Spider-Man (2002)

Mary Jane first appears as Peter Parker narrates the first few minutes of the film. She is depicted as a popular girl at Midtown High School and the ex-girlfriend of star athlete Flash Thompson, while Peter, her next-door neighbor who has had a crush on her since they were in first grade, is an academically gifted but shy outsider. Peter struggles to catch the school bus until MJ asks the driver to stop for him. Later, their class attends a field trip to a lab at Columbia University. Peter's friend Harry Osborn flirts with MJ before Peter takes a picture of her for the school newspaper, after which a genetically-altered spider bites him, ultimately giving him his abilities. Peter then saves Mary Jane from slipping in the school cafeteria with his new abilities the next day and inadvertently triggers a fight with Flash, though he is able to easily dodge Flash's punches and knocks him out with one punch. Peter later apologizes to MJ for the fight while she confides in him about wanting to escape her abusive, alcoholic father and pursue an acting career.

She breaks up with Flash during high school graduation and takes up work as a waitress while looking for acting gigs. While Mary Jane starts dating Harry, she and Peter begin to form a closer friendship. Peter rescues her as Spider-Man when the Green Goblin attacks a parade she was attending with Harry, and again later on from a gang in an alley. Mary Jane thanks Spider-Man with a kiss without him revealing his identity. MJ grows distant from Harry due to his desire to please his father, Norman, at her expense and also subsequently develops feelings for Peter when she realizes how much he cares for her, causing Harry to break up with MJ upon seeing her and Peter holding hands.

Norman, who is the Green Goblin and has deduced Peter is Spider-Man, kidnaps Mary Jane upon realizing Peter loves her, thanks to his son's unwitting confession. The Goblin forces Peter to choose between saving Mary Jane and a Roosevelt Island Tramway car full of children, all of whom he holds hostage on top of the Queensboro Bridge. Spider-Man opts to save both, and despite a struggle, manages to lower MJ and the kids onto a boat, after which the Goblin whisks Spider-Man away for a final confrontation which results in the Goblin's death. At Norman's funeral, Mary Jane tells Peter that she loves him and they kiss. Peter, who decides that for her protection they can't be together, gently rejects her and insists they can only be friends. As he leaves, a saddened Mary Jane realizes that her kiss with Peter reminds her of the one she shared with Spider-Man and suspects that he is the superhero.

Spider-Man 2 (2004)

Two years after the events of the first movie, Mary Jane has found success as a model and Off-Broadway actress. Maintaining her friendships with both Peter and Harry, she continues to pine for Peter, but as he continues to reject her, she starts dating astronaut John Jameson, the son of Peter's boss J. Jonah Jameson. Struggling to balance his vigilantism as Spider-Man with his personal life, Peter fails to make it to one of Mary Jane's performances of The Importance of Being Earnest.

Fed up with being Spider-Man and after losing his powers, Peter tosses his suit away and is able to handle his job and studies and decides to pursue MJ, though she pushes him away when John proposes to her. After Mary Jane kisses John, in a manner that is reminiscent of the upside-down kiss between her and Spider-Man from the first film, she realizes that she does not love John and still wants a relationship with Peter. Later, she meets Peter in a coffee shop where she asks for a kiss to confirm her belief that he is Spider-Man. She even asks him if he loves her which he falsely replies, "I don't", for the sake of his superhero responsibilities and her safety. Before they can kiss, Doctor Octopus attacks the cafe, kidnapping Mary Jane.

Peter regains his abilities and takes up being the web-slinger once more, fighting Doc Ock on a runaway New York City Subway train before being subdued and delivered to Harry, who wants revenge on Spider-Man for allegedly killing his father. After Harry unmasks Peter, he reluctantly provides Doc Ock's and Mary Jane's location so Peter can save her. Peter defeats Doctor Octopus this time as the latter tries to create a fusion reactor capable of destroying the city, and unmasks himself to both Doctor Octopus and MJ, confirming her suspicions that Peter and Spider-Man are in fact one and the same. Peter finally confesses his love for MJ, rescuing her as Doctor Octopus regains control of himself from the malicious AI in his tentacles and repents of his prior actions, sacrificing himself to destroy the reactor. Peter explains his reasoning for not being with her, then allows her to reunite with John. However, MJ leaves John at the altar during their wedding and runs to Peter's apartment, stating that she is willing to accept any risks that come with being in a relationship with Peter. The two finally become a couple, and Mary Jane sees Peter off as he swings into action as Spider-Man to help out a situation, uttering her catchphrase "Go get 'em, Tiger!"

Spider-Man 3 (2007)

Having dated Peter for one year, Mary Jane experiences some struggles in her personal life, losing her Broadway role because of bad reviews and experiencing friction with her boyfriend when an alien symbiote takes him over and brings out the darker parts of his personality which as a result makes him distance himself from her to focus on capturing and killing his uncle's actual killer, Flint Marko. She also faces competition for Peter's affections in the form of his lab partner Gwen Stacy. After she confides in Harry about her problems, Harry, who had suffered amnesia from a prior fight with Peter as the New Goblin, regains his memories after they unwittingly kiss and frightens MJ into breaking up with Peter, setting up a second confrontation between the two former friends which leaves Harry's face disfigured.

Peter, now under more influence from the symbiote, later brings Gwen to a jazz club where MJ has found work as a singer/waitress in order to make her jealous, though Gwen catches on and apologizes to Mary Jane. He then gets into a fight with the club's bouncers and unintentionally hits Mary Jane when she intervenes, leading him to realize what the symbiote suit has turned him into. He leaves and disposes of the symbiote suit, which subsequently falls onto Eddie Brock, Gwen's failed suitor and Peter's bitter rival and fellow photographer, to create Venom. 

Although the symbiote was removed, Peter felt he did too much damage to amend things with Mary Jane as he feels inadequate to propose to her and stares at her apartment window before leaving, thinking she doesn't want to see him again. After she departs from her apartment, Mary Jane gets kidnapped by Brock, who holds a grudge against Peter for ruining his career as a photographer and stealing his girlfriend, teaming up with Flint Marko to lure and kill Spider-Man. Holding her in a web duct taxi as bait, Mary Jane is briefly able to protect herself this time. The subsequent battle pits Spider-Man and the New Goblin against Venom and the Sandman; the two villains are defeated, but Harry loses his life in the process after sacrificing himself to save his friends, dying with MJ and Peter at his side 

Sometime after Harry's funeral, Peter arrives at MJ's jazz club, and the two begin to mend their relationship, sharing a dance.

In other media

Television
Mary Jane also appears in Spider-Man: The New Animated Series, a CGI-animated television series serving as a loose alternate continuation of the first Spider-Man film. She, Peter and Harry attend Empire State University together, and she attempts to start a relationship with Peter without much success, owing to his reluctance to endanger her due to his duties as Spider-Man. Mary Jane is voiced by Lisa Loeb.

Video games
Mary Jane Watson appears in all three video game adaptations of the films. While she is voiced by Cat O'Conner in the first game, Kirsten Dunst reprises her role in a vocal capacity in the second game while Kari Wahlgren takes over the role in the third game.

Reception and legacy
Kirsten Dunst's portrayal of Mary Jane Watson in the Spider-Man films was generally well-received, as she was nominated for several awards for her performance, winning four, including the Empire Award for Best Actress in 2003. Owen Gleiberman of Entertainment Weekly remarked on Dunst's ability to "lend even the smallest line a tickle of flirtatious music". In the Los Angeles Times review, critic Kenneth Turan noted that Dunst and Maguire made a real connection on screen, concluding that their relationship "involved audiences to an extent rarely seen in films".

However, elements of her character were met with a mixed response. In his review of Spider-Man 3, Ryan Gilbey of the NewStatesman was critical of Dunst's character: "the film-makers couldn't come up with much for Mary Jane to do other than scream a lot". Allie Gemmill of Bustle wrote in 2017 that the films portray Mary Jane as a constant damsel in distress and gave the illusion that she was defined primarily through the men in her life. Conversely, Adadora Asidianya wrote that Mary Jane provides a voice of reason for Peter, whether as a friend or a love interest.

Spider-Man and Mary Jane's "upside-down kiss" in Spider-Man is now regarded as one of the most iconic moments in film history. Entertainment Weekly put "the kiss in Spider-Man" on its end-of-the-decade "best-of" list, saying: "There's a fine line between romantic and corny. And the rain-soaked smooch between Spider-Man and Mary Jane from 2002 tap-dances right on that line. The reason it works? Even if she suspects he's Peter Parker, she doesn't try to find out. And that's sexy."

Chris McKenna and Erik Sommers, the screenwriters of Spider-Man: No Way Home, revealed that they'd originally wanted to bring Dunst's portrayal of Mary Jane back for the film, due to the multiversal crossover aspect of the plot bringing over villains from both the Raimi and Marc Webb films, alongside the two versions of Spider-Man played by Maguire and Andrew Garfield, it would make for a poignant addition and a tribute to Raimi's trilogy. While director Jon Watts was in favor of this, Maguire spoke against it, instead preferring that very little be revealed about his incarnation's life following Spider-Man 3, save mentioning they made their relationship work as time went on. His reasoning being "As awesome as it'd be to have me and Kirsten back up on screen together, there's some downsides. One, you'd be going way overbudget getting her, Rosemary [Harris] and Emma [Stone] here on set, and the film's already pretty crowded in cast and scope as is. And two, Tom [Holland]'s the star here. I wouldn't want my story to be overshadowing his when me and Andrew [Garfield] are essentially backup and anniversary additions."

Notes

References

External links

Characters created by Sam Raimi
Characters created by David Koepp
Female characters in film
Fictional actors
Fictional characters from Queens, New York
Fictional models
Fictional singers
Film characters introduced in 2002
Spider-Man (2002 film series)
Spider-Man film characters
Teenage characters in film